Gaetano Antoniazzi (7 August 1825 – 1 August 1897) was an Italian violin-maker.

Antoniazzi was born in Cremona, where he learned his craft in the Ceruti workshop before establishing himself in Milan in 1870 and bringing with him the Cremonese tradition of his teachers Enrico and Giovanni Battista Ceruti.  He died in Milan.

It is only from this date until about 1890 that we find instruments signed by him. Gaetano Antoniazzi, along with his sons Riccardo and Romeo trained Leandro Bisiach, and together with the Antoniazzis, Bisiach influenced the creation of a workshop environment that was to dominate early to middle  20th Century Italian violinmaking.

The result of this highly successful business model was that Milan became a hotbed of skilled violinmakers.
Under this system, many important 20th Century Italian violinmakers received their early training, among them  Gaetano Sgarabotto, Giuseppe Ornati, Ferdinando Garimberti, Igino Sderci, Rocchi Sesto, Cipriano Briani, Giuseppe Pedrazzini, Camillo Mandelli, Ferriccio Varagnolo, Camillo Colombo, Vincenzo Cavani, Pietro Paravicini, Albert Moglie, Andrea Bisiach, Carlo Bisiach, Pietro Borghi, Mirco Tarasconi, Leandro Jr. & Giacomo Bisiach, Iginio Siega and Carlo Ferrario.

Gaetano's work is good, original and spontaneous, but not always very careful. The varnish is yellow-brown or sometimes red-brown in colour. His labels were generally handwritten.

References

External links
La Liuteria Italiana / Italian Violin Making in the 1800s and 1900s - Umberto Azzolina
I Maestri Del Novicento - Carlo Vettori 
La Liuteria Lombarda del '900 - Roberto Codazzi, Cinzia Manfredini  2002
Dictionary of 20th Century Italian Violin Makers - Marlin Brinser 1978 
 
 
Walter Hamma, Meister Italienischer Geigenbaukunst, Wilhelmshaven 1993, 
 Liuteria Parmense

1825 births
1897 deaths
Luthiers from Cremona
19th-century Italian musicians